Hufel (also Romanized as Hūfel and Hūfal; also known as Ahūfal) is a village in Jarahi Rural District, in the Central District of Mahshahr County, Khuzestan Province, Iran. At the 2006 census, its population was 64, in 11 families.

References 

Populated places in Mahshahr County